An extra attacker in ice hockey and ringette is a forward or, less commonly, a defenceman who has been substituted in place of the goaltender. The purpose of this substitution is to gain an offensive advantage to score a goal. The removal of the goaltender for an extra attacker is colloquially called pulling the goalie, resulting in an empty net. This article deals chiefly with situations which apply to the sport of ice hockey.

Ice hockey
The extra attacker is typically utilized in two situations:
Near the end of the game—typically the last 60 to 90 seconds—when a team is losing by one or two goals. In this case, the team risks a goal being scored on its empty net. In "do-or-die" situations such as playoff elimination games, a team may pull the goaltender for an extra attacker earlier in the game or when the team is down by more goals.
During a delayed penalty call. In this case, once the opposing team regains possession of the puck, play will be stopped for the penalty. This means there will be no chance for a shot to be taken by the penalized team rendering the goaltender of little use. On rare occasions (and much to the humiliation of the team which has pulled its goalie), however, the puck can find its way into the empty net (without the penalized team ever gaining possession) as a result of an errant pass or other mishandling of the puck by the team with the man advantage. Hockey rules specify that in this case, the goal is awarded to the player on the penalized team who had last touched the puck and the serving of the penalty begins after the faceoff at centre ice.

The term sixth attacker is also used when both teams are at even strength; teams may also pull the goalie when shorthanded by a player, in which case the extra attacker would be a fifth attacker. It is exceptionally rare for a penalized team to do so during five on three situations.

Also, in four-on-four overtime, an extra attacker is added to a team on a power play in the case where another minor penalty is committed against them. This results in a five-on-three. In leagues with a three-on-three overtime, each minor penalty results in an extra attacker for the team on the power play (up to a maximum of five total skaters plus goalie). Penalized players return to the ice when their penalty expires, and the proper on-ice strength (e.g. 4-3, 4-4, or 3-3) is corrected at the first appropriate stoppage.

In leagues like the National Hockey League (NHL) where regular season standings are based on a point system (i.e. two points are awarded for a win, one point for losing in overtime or a shootout, and zero points for a loss in regulation), a team may be forced to use an extra attacker even when the score is tied near the end of regulation of a game at or near the end of the regular season to avoid being eliminated from playoff contention. The NHL discourages teams from pulling their goaltender during an overtime period; if a team does so, and subsequently loses the game when their opponent scores an empty net goal, the losing team does not receive the one point in the standings they would otherwise have received for an overtime loss.

Russian and Soviet coaches are known for refusing to pull their goalies when behind late in games, as was the case in the 1980 Winter Olympics medal game between the Soviet Union and the USA.

The extra attacker concept was first utilized in the NHL by Art Ross, coach and general manager of the Boston Bruins, who picked up the idea from experimental incidents in amateur and minor-league hockey. In a playoff game against the Montreal Canadiens on March 26, 1931, Ross had goaltender Tiny Thompson go to the bench for a sixth skater in the final minute of play; the Bruins failed to score and lost the game 1–0.

A 2018 model by Aaron Brown and Cliff Asness based on the 2015–16 NHL season suggested that, for a team down one point where losing 2–0 is no worse than losing 1–0, the ideal time to pull the goalie is somewhere between 5 and 6 minutes from the end of the match.

See also
Rover (ice hockey)
Empty net goal
Goalkeeper (association football)#Playmaking and attack - rare situation in association football in which a goalkeeper becomes an attacking player

References

Ice hockey terminology
Ice hockey strategy